Stephen Walter Stanton (born August 22, 1961) is an American voice actor and visual effects artist. His roles include Sasha Nein in Psychonauts and Psychonauts 2, Grand Moff Tarkin in the Star Wars franchise, Admiral Raddus in Rogue One and Griff Halloran on Star Wars Resistance.

Early life
Stanton was born in Augsburg, Bavaria, West Germany on August 22, 1961.

Career
Stanton is well-known as a voice double for Tim Allen, Nicolas Cage, John Cusack, Peter Cushing, Robert Downey Jr., Roger Ebert, Jeff Goldblum, Alec Guinness, Clive Owen, Vincent Schiavelli and Bruce Willis, among others. He also provides original voices for Disney television series and theme park attractions. 

He voiced Admiral Tarkin and Mas Amedda in Star Wars: The Bad Batch.

Filmography

Film

Television

Video games

Theme parks
 Disney California Adventure Jessie's Critter Carousel – Stinky Pete
 Disney California Adventure Toy Story Midway Mania! – Stinky Pete
 Disney D23 Expo Carousel of Projects – Narrator
 Disneyland Club 33 – Alfred the Vulture
 Disneyland Paris – Woody & Jessie's Wild West Adventure (Lucky Nugget Saloon) – Stinky Pete
 Disneyland Rivers of America – Mark Twain Riverboat Captain
 Disneyland Snow White's Enchanted Wish – Safety Spiel (as Happy)
 Disneyland The Haunted Mansion Phantom Radio app – Phineas
 Hong Kong Disneyland Mystic Manor – Lord Henry Mystic
 Shanghai Disneyland Celebration of Dreams Show (2016) – Happy
 Walt Disney World D23 Destination D: Attraction Rewind – Father
 Walt Disney World Seven Dwarfs Mine Train – Happy
 Walt Disney World Tomorrowland Transit Authority – TTA Announcer

Visual effects work

Tippett Studio
 Starship Troopers (1997) – Digital Scanner Operator
 Armageddon (1998) – Digital Scanner Operator (Uncredited)
 Virus (1999) – Digital Scanner Operator
 Komodo (1999) – Digital Scanner Operator (Uncredited)
 My Favorite Martian (1999) – Digital Scanner Operator
 Hollow Man (2000) – Digital Scanner Operator
 Mission to Mars (2000) – Digital Scanner Operator (Uncredited)
 Cats & Dogs (2001) – Digital Scanner Operator (Uncredited)
 Evolution (2001) – Digital Scanner Operator

Boss Film Studios
 Solar Crisis (1990) – Production Assistant
 The Last of the Mohicans (1992) – Computer Graphics Coordinator
 Alien 3 (1992) – Digital Camera Operator
 Batman Returns (1992) – Digital Camera Operator
 Journey To Technopia (1993) - Digital Film I/O
 Cliffhanger (1993) – Computer Graphics Coordinator
 Last Action Hero (1993) – Computer Graphics Coordinator (Uncredited)

References

External links
 Official website

1961 births
Living people
20th-century American comedians
20th-century American male actors
21st-century American comedians
21st-century American male actors
Actors from Augsburg
American impressionists (entertainers)
American male video game actors
American male voice actors
Visual effects artists